Jisrin (also spelled Jisrein) is a village in southern Syria, administratively part of the Markaz Rif Dimashq District of the Rif Dimashq Governorate, located just east of Damascus. According to the Syria Central Bureau of Statistics (CBS), Jisrin had a population of 9,442 in the 2004 census.

References 

Populated places in Markaz Rif Dimashq District